Marcel Just Théodore Marie Couraud (20 October 1912 in Limoges – 14 September 1986 in Loches) was a French orchestral and choral conductor and organist.

Biography 
Couraud studied organ with André Marchal in Paris where he attended the Ecole Normale de Musique. He also took courses in composition with Nadia Boulanger and conducting with Charles Munch.

In 1944 he founded the Ensemble Vocal Marcel-Couraud, with whom he performed chansons and madrigals of the Renaissance period (including Orlando di Lasso and Claudio Monteverdi) as well as works by contemporary composers such as Trois Petites Liturgies de la présence divine by Olivier Messiaen. He led the ensemble and also served as the choral director of the Maîtrise de Radio France until 1954 and then conducted the Bach Choir and Bach Orchestra Stuttgart. He also commissioned Epithalame in 1953, a vocal chamber piece by André Jolivet.

From 1967, he was director of the choir of the broadcaster ORTF of Paris. From its members, he formed in the following year the Groupe Vocal de France, with whom he performed contemporary works such as Cinq Rechants by Messiaen, the Dodécaméron by Ivo Malec, Récitatif, air et variations of Gilbert Amy, Nuits by Iannis Xenakis and the Sonata à douze by Betsy Jolas.
Marcel Couraud

References

1912 births
1986 deaths
People from Limoges
French choral conductors
French male conductors (music)
20th-century French conductors (music)
20th-century French male musicians